Azrul Amri Burhan (born 1 November 1975) is a former Malaysian footballer. He was described as the 'next Azizol'.

Career
He played with Kuala Lumpur FA and Perak FA during his heyday, where he won two Malaysia Cup with Perak and two Malaysia FA Cup with Kuala Lumpur. He also played with Negeri Sembilan FA and club side TNB Kelantan  towards the end of his career.

National team
Azrul has represented the Olympic team, Malaysia (U23). He also played for Malaysia national futsal team and was in the squad that took part in the 1996 FIFA Futsal World Championship in Spain.

His stint with Olympic team was notable, for when he played in the 1995 Toulon Tournament, he received a severe injury when he was tackled by a young David Beckham while playing against England. Thus, he missed the opportunity on trial with france club, Montpellier. The injury, along with his discipline problems, curtailed a promising international future for Azrul who was tipped to be a star midfielder for Malaysia.

Honours

Kuala Lumpur
Malaysia FA Cup: 1994
Malaysia Charity Shield: 1995

Perak
Malaysia Cup: 1998, 2000
Malaysia Charity Shield: 1999

References

Malaysian footballers
Perak F.C. players
Living people
1975 births
People from Perak
Malaysian people of Malay descent
Association football forwards
Negeri Sembilan FA players